Knut Johannes Hougen (26 November 1854 – 29 July 1954) was a Norwegian politician for the Liberal Party. He served as Minister of Education and Church Affairs from 1909 to 1910. Hougen was also a representative for the city of Kristiansand in the Norwegian Parliament in the period 1908–27. He was central to the development of broadcasting in Norway, and in 1932 published the 2-volume work Oslo kringkastingsselskaps historie ("The Development of Oslo Broadcasting Corporation").

References

1854 births
1954 deaths
Government ministers of Norway
Ministers of Education of Norway